Robert Andres Bonta (born September 22, 1972) is an American lawyer and politician serving as the attorney general of California since 2021. A member of the Democratic Party, he previously served as a member of the California State Assembly for the 18th district from 2012 to 2021 and as a member of the Alameda City Council from 2010 to 2012.

Upon his election to the California State Assembly, he became the first Filipino-American to enter the California State Legislature, where he chaired the California Asian & Pacific Islander Legislative Caucus.

On March 24, 2021, Governor Gavin Newsom announced that he would be appointing Bonta as Attorney General of California to succeed Xavier Becerra, who resigned the position to become Secretary of Health and Human Services under President Joe Biden. His appointment was confirmed by the California State Legislature on April 22 and he was sworn in on April 23, becoming the first Filipino-American to occupy the position of California Attorney General.

Early life and education
Robert Andres Bonta was born on September 22, 1972, in Quezon City, Philippines. Bonta immigrated with his family to California at just two months old. Through his father, Warren Bonta, Bonta was a U.S. citizen at birth.

The Bonta family initially lived in a trailer at Nuestra Señora Reina de la Paz, the United Farm Workers headquarters near Keene, California, before moving north to Fair Oaks, a suburb of Sacramento. At Bella Vista High School, Bonta was a soccer player and graduated as class valedictorian.

Bonta then attended Yale University, where he graduated cum laude with a B.A. in history in 1993 and played on the Yale Bulldogs men's soccer team. After completing his undergraduate studies, Bonta attended University of Oxford for one year studying politics, philosophy, and economics.  In 1995, Bonta enrolled at Yale Law School and graduated with a Juris Doctor in 1998.

Early career 
After his year at Oxford, Bonta returned to New Haven to attend Yale Law School while concurrently working as site coordinator at nonprofit organization Leadership, Education, and Athletics in Partnership (LEAP), where he developed policy and managed activities for 30 staff members and 100 children for an organization serving the Church Street South neighborhood. Bonta was admitted to the California State Bar in 1999.

From 1998 to 1999, Bonta clerked for Judge Alvin W. Thompson of the United States District Court for the District of Connecticut. Bonta then returned to California to be a litigation associate with San Francisco law firm Keker & Van Nest. Working at Keker & Van Nest from 1999 to 2003, Bonta practiced in a variety of areas including civil rights, crime, insurance, patent infringement, legal malpractice, contract, and fraud. As a private attorney, Bonta was part of a team that worked with the ACLU to implement new protocols to prevent racial profiling by the California Highway Patrol.

From 2003 to 2012, Bonta was a Deputy City Attorney of San Francisco under Dennis Herrera. During his tenure, Bonta represented the City of San Francisco in a lawsuit filed by Kelly Medora, a pre-school teacher who accused a San Francisco Police Department officer of using excessive force during a jaywalking arrest. Bonta, as the assigned attorney by the City Attorney's Office, argued for the city that Medora and her friends put themselves and others in danger by walking on the street and were warned to leave by Damonte and another officer. The city eventually settled the lawsuit for $235,000 in May 2008. In 2009, Bonta argued on behalf of San Francisco, defending its strip search policy in jails by asserting that concerns about smuggling of drugs and weapons at a main city jail presented reasonable basis for strip searches. The United States Court of Appeals for the Ninth Circuit ruled 6–5 in favor of the strip search policy in February 2010.

Politics

Alameda City Council
Bonta was elected to Alameda City Council in November 2010. He was sworn in on December 21, 2010, and appointed vice mayor the same day. Within a year, he declared his intent to run for state assembly. In 2012, some Alameda residents started a recall campaign against him but the effort never qualified for the ballot, with Bonta winning election to the state assembly in November 2012. The final city council meeting during which he was a member of the city council was on November 20, 2012.

California State Assembly

As a member of the state assembly, Bonta authored major changes to California's penal code, as well as immigration, health care, and housing law.

Bonta introduced legislation in January 2013 that would require California public schools, as funding is available, to teach students "the role of immigrants, including Filipino Americans" in the farm labor movement. It was signed into law in October of that same year by Jerry Brown. Bonta's mother, Cynthia Bonta, helped organize Filipino and Mexican American farmworkers for the United Farm Workers.

Bonta authored legislation in 2016 to outlaw "balanced billing" by hospitals in order to help consumers avoid surprise medical bills. Brown signed the bill into law September 2016.

Bonta introduced legislation to repeal a McCarthy-era ban on Communist Party members holding government jobs in California. The bill received criticism from Republicans, veteran groups and Vietnamese Americans, with Republican Assemblyman Travis Allen calling it "blatantly offensive to all Californians." After passing the State Assembly, the legislation was later withdrawn.

Bonta and State Senator Robert Hertzberg co-authored Senate Bill 10, which when passed, made California the first state in the nation to eliminate money bail for suspects awaiting trial and replace it with a risk-assessment system. On August 28, 2018, Governor Jerry Brown signed the bill into law.

Bonta introduced legislation to end the use of for-profit, private prisons and detention facilities in California. Signed in 2019 by Gavin Newson, AB 32 made California the first state in the nation to ban both private prisons and civil detention centers.

Bonta introduced Assembly Bill 1481 in 2019, which sought to outlaw baseless evictions and mandate landlords demonstrate "just cause" in order to evict residential tenants. The bill was combined with a statewide cap on rent increases and other rental proposals into a single piece of legislation. That bill, Assembly Bill 1482, was passed by the California Legislature and signed by Newsom in October 2019.

Bonta joined Assemblymember Kevin McCarty and other colleagues in 2019 as a lead author of Assembly Bill 1506, a bill to mandate an independent review of officers involved in shootings in California by the California Department of Justice. The bill was signed into law in September 2020 by Newsom.

Following the murder of George Floyd and a July 2020 incident in Central Park involving a white woman calling 9-1-1 to report a black man who asked her to obey park rules, Bonta introduced legislation that would criminalize knowingly making a false call to the police based on someone's race, religion, or gender.

In February 2021, CalMatters reported that Bonta had regularly solicited donations, also known as "behested payments", from companies with business before California's legislature for his wife's nonprofit organization.

Attorney General of California
On March 24, 2021, Governor Gavin Newsom announced that he would be appointing Bonta as Attorney General of California to succeed Xavier Becerra, who had resigned the position to become U.S. Secretary of Health and Human Services under President Joe Biden. He assumed the office on April 23, 2021, and won a full term for the office in the general election in November 2022. Bonta is the first Filipino-American to hold the office.

On June 28, 2022, Bonta released an online dashboard containing data on firearms in what he said was an effort to improve transparency and increase public trust. The following day, the site was taken down after the discovery of a vulnerability in the site that had allowed the unauthorized disclosure of personal information. The dashboard had allowed sensitive information about concealed-carry weapon permit holders in the state to be accessed and downloaded. Additionally, data from the following dashboards were also impacted: Assault Weapon Registry, Handguns Certified for Sale, Dealer Record of Sale, Firearm Safety Certificate, and Gun Violence Restraining Order dashboards. The information exposed included names, date of birth, gender, race, driver’s license number, addresses, and criminal history. Gun rights advocates criticized the breach, with the California Rifle & Pistol Association saying it had "put the lives of judges, prosecutors, domestic violence victims and everyday citizens at risk" and gave criminals "a map to their homes". The leak happened less than a week after a major Supreme Court case, New York State Rifle & Pistol Association, Inc. v. Bruen, had struck down New York's system for issuing concealed carry permits, systems that had been allowed in California counties prior to the ruling. Bonta condemned the incident, saying, it was "unacceptable and falls short of...expectations for this department", and that he was "deeply disturbed and angered", while his office said it was investigating how much information might have been exposed.

Electoral history

2014 California State Assembly

2016 California State Assembly

2018 California State Assembly

2020 California State Assembly

2022 California State Attorney General

Personal life
Bonta's wife, Mia Bonta, is a member of the California State Assembly and was elected in a 2021 special election to fill her husband's vacant seat. She previously served as the president of the Alameda Unified School District. She and Bonta have three children. Their daughter, Reina, is a filmmaker and plays soccer for the Yale Bulldogs and the Philippines national team.

See also
List of first minority male lawyers and judges in California

References

External links
 , Mia Bonta webpage
 Campaign website
 Official Facebook page

1972 births
21st-century American politicians
California Attorneys General
California lawyers
California politicians of Filipino descent
Living people
Democratic Party members of the California State Assembly
Citizens of the United States through descent
People from Fair Oaks, California
Politicians from Alameda, California
People from Kern County, California
Yale Bulldogs men's soccer players
Yale College alumni
Yale Law School alumni
Association football players not categorized by nationality
21st-century American lawyers